Pisagua is a Chilean port on the Pacific Ocean, located in Huara comuna (municipality), in Tarapacá Region, northern Chile. In 2007, the new province of El Tamarugal was established and the comuna of Huara, previously within the province of Iquique, was incorporated to the newly created province.

Early history

According to Francisco Riso Patrón, and stated in Diccionario Geográfico de las Provincias de Tacna y Tarapacá, the name Pisagua has a quechua origin, meaning "place of scarce water": Pis - scarce, agua - water.

Pisagua was founded in 1611 after an edict by the Viceroy of Peru which established a base from which it could be possible to stem the illegal traffic of gold and silver flowing from the important mines of Potosí and Oruro, in the Highlands of the "Audiencia of Charcas", to the British and Dutch pirates operating in the Corregimiento de Arica. Thus, Pisagua became a minor port, subjected to the major Port of San Marcos de Arica.

This settlement, known today as 'Pisagua Viejo' (Old Pisagua) developed at the south side of the Quebrada Tiliviche, on part of an extensive ancient midden deposit.  Some adobe ruins remain.

The "Nitrate boom"

It was not until 1810 when large nitrate ("salitre" or saltpeter) deposits were discovered in the Corregimiento de Tarapacá that Pisagua became an important port due to its major role in the export of this product. Tsunami forced the transfer of Pisagua to the place where it lies today, in 1836. This site is a small plain located between the peninsulas of Punta Pichalo and Punta Pisagua, about 3 km South of Pisagua Viejo.

The War of the Pacific

On November 2, 1879 Pisagua was occupied by Chilean troops during the Guerra del Pacífico, in the "Battle of Pisagua". After the war, Pisagua went from Peruvian hands to Chilean administration.

The heydays of the town

Pisagua became an important port of the South Pacific during the nitrate boom  of the 1870s. During the first years of the 20th century, Pisagua had become one of the most important ports of the whole country (after Valparaíso and Iquique), with offices from major banks, and one of the most beautiful cities on the Southern Pacific coast.

Railway history

The construction of a standard gauge railway line to connect Pisagua with the interior started in about 1865, while Pisagua was still a Peruvian possession.  Work continued under Chilean administration, and by 1935 Pisagua was the northern terminus of a  network of main and branch lines, with a connection to Iquique, the principal terminus of the line. Trains climbed from sea level at Pisagua to the interior plateau via three reversing zig-zags and a heavily graded line.  Supplies for the interior towns and nitrate works were hauled up from the coast, and nitrate for export made up the return load.  The principal traffic was always nitrate, after which came fuel, passengers, perishables, parcels, general merchandise, and livestock.  Water for the steam locomotives and the town relied on two wells at Dolores (see map),  from Pisagua, which today still derives its water from this source.

Decline

When the nitrate boom came to an end, the port of Pisagua could keep some degree of importance because of its new role in the fishmeal industry. However, at the end of the 1950s, Pisagua lost most of its population and economic base and went into precipitous decline and even ceased to be the third town in importance of Tarapacá province (after Arica and Iquique).

Pisagua as a prisoner site

Pisagua has often been used as a concentration camp for political prisoners. This happened during the rule of Carlos Ibáñez del Campo (for male homosexuals), as well as that of Gabriel González Videla (for communists, anarchists and revolutionaries) and more recently, during Augusto Pinochet's dictatorship (for left-wing militants). Many bodies have been found under the waters of the port and several graves have been discovered in Pisagua since the end of Pinochet's military regime. Pisagua is geographically isolated, with the ocean on one side and a big desert on the other.

Pisagua today

The earthworks, embankments and cuttings that carried the railway into the town are clearly visible on the bare ground.  The old railway station still stands in Pisagua itself, where there are other interesting (although semi-derelict) buildings made with Oregon pine wood. Good examples are the turret of the clock, the municipal theatre, and the hospital, all dating from the nitrate period. Today, Pisagua is no longer the proud and rich port that once was but a small and isolated village with a population of just 260, included in the municipality of Huara, which has only 2,600 inhabitants itself.

References

External links
"Canzoni contro la Guerra" - Pisagua
"Voices of a Natural Prison: Tourism Development and Fisheries"

Port settlements in Chile
Populated places in El Tamarugal Province
Railways with Zig Zags